
Pilawit'u is a Bolivian lake located in Vacas Municipality, Arani Province, Cochabamba Department. The last four thousand years of environmental and vegetation change has been recently reconstructed from the lake sediments of Pilawit'u (Lake Challacaba)

The main tributaries of Pilawit'u are Chiwalaki, Challa Q'awa, Muña Mayu and Phaqcha Pata Mayu whose tributaries are T'utura Mayu, Phaqcha Pata and the Phaqcha River.

See also 
 Asiru Qucha
 Parqu Qucha
 Phaqcha Mayu
 Qullpa Qucha

References 

Lakes of Cochabamba Department